Phoenix Union Bioscience High School is part of the Phoenix Union High School District.  The campus is located in downtown Phoenix, Arizona. The school's mission is to prepare tomorrow's scientists by providing the students of Phoenix Union with a science education through intensive collaboration with the academic and scientific communities in downtown Phoenix. The new building and renovation of the current building began in June 2006, and opened in the fall of 2007.

Enrollment
Bioscience hosts approximately 180 freshmen through seniors.  The first class of 43 students graduated from Bioscience in May 2010.  97 percent of its 10th graders met or excelled the AIMS Math exam (in 2009), the highest public (non-charter) school percentage in the Valley, and No. 2 in the state. Their science scores were No. 3 in the state among non-charter schools.

In its first year of eligibility, Bioscience earned an "Excelling" Achievement Profile from the State, the highest a school can attain.

Campus
The $10 million campus which opened in October 2007, is located in Phoenix's downtown Biotechnology Center and open to students throughout the District.  The Bioscience High School campus, which was designed by The Orcutt-Winslow Partnership  won the American School Board Journal's  Learning By Design 2009 Grand Prize Award.  The school received this award for its classrooms, collaborative learning spaces, and smooth circulation.

Phoenix Union High School District received a $2.4 million small schools grant from the City of Phoenix to renovate Bioscience's existing historic McKinley building for a Bio-medical program.  It includes administrative office, four classrooms, a library/community room and a student demonstration area.

In 2014, Bioscience ranked number 27 on Best Education Degrees' "Most Amazing High School Campuses In The World" list. The list recognized 30 school campuses around the world for their impressive modern designs. Modernism was the designers' objective when designing the school, according to one of the architects Matt Johnson. Modernism in the school comes from being quipped with a solar charging station, which students can use to charge their electronic devices, and solar panels to provide the school with a portion of its power.

References

External links
 Bioscience High School
 Phoenix Union High School District website
 Arizona Department of Education School Report Card
 Facebook
 Twitter

Biology education
High schools in Phoenix, Arizona
Educational institutions established in 2006
Public high schools in Arizona
2006 establishments in Arizona